Surfactant protein D, also known as SP-D, is a lung surfactant protein part of the collagenous family of proteins called collectin. In humans, SP-D is encoded by the SFTPD gene and is part of the innate immune system. Each SP-D subunit is composed of an N-terminal domain, a collagenous region, a nucleating neck region, and a C-terminal lectin domain. Three of these subunits assemble to form a homotrimer, which further assemble into a tetrameric complex.

Interactions 

Surfactant protein D has been shown to interact with DMBT1, and hemagglutinin of influenza A virus.  Post-translational modification of SP-D i.e. S-nitrosylation switches its function.

See also 
 pulmonary surfactant

References

Further reading

External links 
 

Collectins